The R108 road is a regional road in Ireland, linking Drogheda in County Louth to Christchurch Place, Dublin.

The official description of the R108 from the Roads Act 1993 (Classification of Regional Roads) Order 2012  reads:

R108: Dublin - Naul, County Dublin - Drogheda, County Louth

Between its junction with R137 at Christchurch Place and its junction with R135 at Phibsborough Road via High Street, Cornmarket, Bridge Street, Father Matthew Bridge, Church Street, Church Street Upper and Constitution Hill all in the city of Dublin

and

between its junction with R135 at Botanic Road in the city of Dublin and its junction with R122 at Newtown in the county of Fingal via Botanic Road, Saint Mobhi Road and Ballymun Road in the city of Dublin: Ballymun Road and Harristown in the county of Fingal and

between its junction with R122 at Shanganhill and its junction with R125 at Roganstown via Coultry, Huntstown, Cooks Cross, Knocksedan Bridge and Rathbeal all in the county of Fingal

and

between its junction with R125 at Roganstown in the county of Fingal and its junction with R132 at Dublin Road in the borough of Drogheda via Belinstown, Ballyboghill, Gerrardstown, Nags Head, Naul and Westown in the county of Fingal: Naul Bridge at the boundary between the county of Fingal and the county of Meath: Clinstown, Calliagstown and Bryanstown in the county of Meath: Beamore Road, Duleek Street and Mary Street in the borough of Drogheda.

See also
Roads in Ireland
National primary road
National secondary road
Regional road

References

Regional roads in the Republic of Ireland
Roads in County Louth
Roads in County Meath
Roads in Fingal
Roads in Dublin (city)